Morocco's network of motorways is administered by the state-owned company Autoroutes du Maroc (ADM). It runs the network on a pay-per-use basis, with toll stations placed along its length. The general speed limit is 120 km/h.

History
The first expressway in the country was the A1 Casablanca-Rabat. Construction of the first section started in 1975. Completion of this road between the economic and the administrative capitals took 13 years. Originally, use of the road was free of charge. The toll-road system was introduced as one measure to prevent lengthy construction times, as happened with this first road. Finding investors for new roads would be easier if these roads generated their own revenue to repay investors.

Realized 
In 2006, it was announced that ADM will be investing 6.18 billion dirhams ($859 million) to develop its highway network in 2007. These investment packages are part of the objective that aim to complete 1,500 km by 2012.

As of August 2016, ADM manages 1808 km of Morocco's toll roads. As of November 2016 the total length of Morocco's motorways is 1,808 kilometres (paid) and 1,093 kilometres (free) expressways.

Planned 
The Kingdom of Morocco is planning investments of around €23 billion in road construction until 2035. The Moroccan government has announced that more than 5,500 kilometres of new highways and expressways are to be constructed with investment totalling €8.8 billion. This includes 700 km of 3x2 roads that will be constructed.

Also 45,000 km of new rural roads will be created in rural areas and the modernization of 7,000 km of rural roads. It is part of new plan of the Moroccan Ministry of Transport, which will invest 660 billion dirhams in the transport and logistics sector.

Completed roads

The main Moroccan expressways are:

Rabat Ring Road (42 km)
A1 Casablanca-Rabat (86 km)
A1 Casablanca–Safi (255 km)
A2 Rabat-Fes (190 km)
A2 Fes-Oujda (306 km)
A3 Casablanca-Marrakesh (220 km)
A3 extension to Agadir (233 km)
A4 Berrechid-Benni Mellal (172 km)
A5 Rabat-Tangier Med (308 km)
A7 Tetouan-Fnideq (28 km)

The construction history of these expressways by segment is as follows:

Road safety
In 2007 762 accidents with casualties were reported, a 5% increase on 2006. The accident-rate per 100 million traveled kilometers dropped by 20% from 30.2 to 24.1 between these years, but the total number as well as rate of deaths didn't go down.

A breakdown of these figures:

Increasing road-safety
Increasing safety is an important goal for the ADM: the new autoroutes are designed to improve safety and the ADM also believes that extending the express-way network will increase overall safety as the through-going (and often high-speed) traffic is moved away from the Route Nationals, that run through the cities and villages along the way. Expressways also use non-level crossings and because there is no oncoming traffic overtaking cars is safer than on normal roads.
The ADM also publishes accident figures to increase the attention of the public in road-safety.

In the first quarter of 2011 the number of accidents on expressways with injuries fell 21% compared to the same period in 2010

See also
 List of roads and highways
 List of toll roads
 Société Nationale des Autoroutes du Maroc

References and notes

External links

 
Toll roads